Jason Lammers (born September 11, 1975) is an American ice hockey coach and former player. He was named as the third coach for Niagara in the spring of 2017.

Career
The Pittsburgh native played for the ice hockey team for four seasons while attending SUNY-Geneseo. After graduating with a BA in history he played two seasons as a professional in the now-defunct WCHL(West Coast Hockey League).

Lammers started his coaching career in 2000 as a volunteer assistant with Clarkson before taking a full-time assistant position with Hobart the following year. The Golden Knights lured him back a year later as an assistant but after head coach Mark Morris was fired mid-season Lammers was on the move once again. He spent one season at both Alaska and Princeton before receiving his first head coaching job with his alma mater. Lammers led  Geneseo to a 19–9–2 record, winning the SUNYAC tournament for the second year in a row.

He didn't stick around to build on the success, however, leaving to join the staff at Ohio State in 2006. With the Buckeyes Lammers finally found a home for longer than a year, remaining with the program for three seasons before accepting a similar post with Colorado College for two seasons. He had a four year stint with Massachusetts–Lowell under Norm Bazin, helping the team reach the 2013 Frozen Four, before he got his second head coaching gig, this time with the Dubuque Fighting Saints.

In his first season with the team Lammers got the junior squad to post a 39–19–1 record and make it all the way to the Clark Cup Final. His second campaign was only slightly less successful as the Fighting Saints made the Eastern Conference Final. After the season Lammers was hired as the head coach for Niagara, replacing Dave Burkholder.

Head coaching record

College

References

External links

1975 births
Living people
American ice hockey coaches
Ice hockey coaches from Pennsylvania
Sportspeople from Pittsburgh
Niagara Purple Eagles men's ice hockey coaches
Idaho Steelheads (WCHL) players
Phoenix Mustangs players
State University of New York at Geneseo alumni
Ice hockey people from Pittsburgh